Georges Bordier (7 April 1880 – 9 October 1948) was a French sports shooter. He competed in the 50 m rifle event at the 1924 Summer Olympics.

References

External links
 

1880 births
1948 deaths
French male sport shooters
Olympic shooters of France
Shooters at the 1924 Summer Olympics
Place of birth missing